Daniel P. Moul (born October 10, 1950) is an American politician and businessman currently serving as a Republican member of the Pennsylvania House of Representatives from the 91st District since 2007.

Early life and education
Moul was born on October 10, 1950 in Hanover, Pennsylvania. He graduated from New Oxford High School in 1977 and studied finance at York College of Pennsylvania.

Career
Prior to his run for political office, Moul worked in sales at Utz Brands. After that Moul operated his own real estate development business.

Pennsylvania House of Representatives
Moul was first elected to the Pennsylvania House of Representatives in 2006. He was re-elected to eight more consecutive terms.

In 2020, Moul was among twenty-six Pennsylvania House Republicans who called for the reversal of Joe Biden's certification as the winner of Pennsylvania's electoral votes in the 2020 United States presidential election, citing false claims of election irregularities.

Personal life
Moul lives in Conewago Township, Adams County, Pennsylvania with his wife Lori. They have two children and three grandchildren.

References

External links
Pennsylvania House of Representatives - Dan Moul official PA House website
Pennsylvania House Republican Caucus - Representative Dan Moul official Party website

Living people
Republican Party members of the Pennsylvania House of Representatives
People from Adams County, Pennsylvania
York College of Pennsylvania alumni
1950 births
21st-century American politicians